Stargate is an adventure military science fiction franchise.

Stargate may also refer to:

In general concepts
 Teleportation gate
 Faster-than-light travel portal
 Hyperspace portal
 Jumpgate

In the science-fiction media franchise

Movies and television
 Stargate (film), a 1994 science-fiction film directed by Roland Emmerich
 Stargate SG-1, a science-fiction television series first aired in 1997, a continuation of the story in 1994 movie
 Stargate (comics), a comic-book series based on the SG-1 series
 Stargate: The Ark of Truth, a 2008 science-fiction film made for DVD and television
 Stargate: Continuum, a 2008 science-fiction film made for DVD and television
 Stargate: Revolution (working title), a cancelled science-fiction film made for DVD and television
 Stargate Infinity, an SG-1 spin-off cartoon series first aired in 2002
 Stargate Atlantis, an SG-1 spin-off television series first aired in 2004
 Stargate: Extinction (working title), a cancelled science-fiction film made for DVD and television
 Stargate Universe, an SG-1 spin-off television series first aired in 2009
 Stargate Origins, a Stargate (film)/SG-1 spin-off web series first aired in 2018
 Stargate (device), the central device in the movie and television shows

Games
 Stargate (1981 video game), also known as Defender II, a 1981 arcade game
 Stargate Worlds, a cancelled MMORPG based on the Stargate universe
 Stargate: Resistance, a 2010 team-based third-person shooter based on the Stargate universe
 Stargate (pinball), a game produced by Gottlieb based on the 1994 film
 Stargate (1995 video game), a game for the Super Nintendo Entertainment System and Sega Genesis based on the 1994 film

In other fiction
Star Gate (novel), a 1958 novel by Andre Norton
Stargate, a 1976 science-fiction novel by Stephen Robinett
Stargate, a science-fiction book by Pauline Gedge published in 1982
The Star Gate, an alien artifact in the novel 2001: A Space Odyssey
StarGate, a powerful gateway to the universe, in the Sara Douglass series Wayfarer Redemption
The Stargate Conspiracy, a book by Lynn Picknett and Clive Prince
Stargate, the technology used for interstellar travel depicted in Buck Rogers in the 25th Century

Other uses
Stargate YT-33, turbojet powered derivative of the Windstar YF-80
Stargate Project, a series of remote viewing experiments performed by the CIA, Army, and DIA from 1972 to 1995
STARGATE, an RF tracking facility of the University of Texas at Brownsville, started in 2014
Stargate (music producers), Norwegian record producers
The Stargate, a 1999 album by Mortiis
Stargate Digital, a visual effects company
Star Gate, an illusion in John Horton Conway's Game of Life where spaceships seem faster than the speed of light (cellular automaton)

See also
 
 
 Stargate School, a school for gifted and talented education in the Adams County, Colorado Five Star School District
 Starr Gate, a place in Blackpool, England